I Dream Too Much is a 2015 American coming of age comedy-drama film written and directed by Katie Cokinos and starring Eden Brolin, Danielle Brooks and Diane Ladd.  The film is Cokinos' directorial debut and Richard Linklater served as an executive producer.

Plot
Instead of chasing boys on the beach with her friends, recent college grad Dora finds herself caring for her reclusive Great Aunt in snowy upstate New York. When the imaginative girl discovers her aunt's hidden romantic past, Dora dreams that their revelation will pull Aunt Vera and herself from their mutual depressions.

Cast
Diane Ladd as Vera
Danielle Brooks as Abbey
Chelsea Lopez as Irene
James McCaffrey as Nikki
Eden Brolin as Dora
Christina Rouner as Helen

References

External links
 
 
 

2015 films
American coming-of-age comedy-drama films
2015 directorial debut films
2010s coming-of-age comedy-drama films
2015 comedy films
2015 drama films
2010s English-language films
2010s American films